SN 2013fs is a supernova, located in the spiral galaxy NGC 7610, discovered by the Intermediate Palomar Transient Factory sky survey at Palomar Observatory in October 2013 (and originally named iPTF 13dqy). It was discovered approximately three hours from explosion (first light) and was observed in ultraviolet and X-ray wavelengths, among others, within several hours. Optical spectra were obtained beginning at six hours from explosion, making these the earliest such detailed observations ever made of a supernova.

The star that produced SN 2013fs was a red supergiant with a mass 10 times the mass of the Sun, an effective temperature of 3,500 K, a radius 607 times the size of the Sun, and no more than a few million years old when it exploded. The star was surrounded by a relatively dense shell of gas shed by the star within the year before it exploded. Radiation emitted by the supernova explosion illuminated this shell, which had a mass of approximately one-thousandth the mass of the Sun, and its outer fringe was about five times the distance of Neptune from the Sun.

References

External links
 Light curves and spectra on the Open Supernova Catalog

20131006
Supernovae
Pegasus (constellation)